Group B of the EuroBasket Women 2017 took place between 16 and 19 June 2017. The group played all of its games at Hradec Králové, Czech Republic.

Standings

All times are local (UTC+2).

Matches

Belarus vs Italy

Turkey vs Slovakia

Slovakia vs Belarus

Italy vs Turkey

Belarus vs Turkey

Slovakia vs Italy

External links
Official website

Group B
2016–17 in Belarusian basketball
2016–17 in Italian basketball
2016–17 in Turkish basketball
2016–17 in Slovak basketball